Pentalofos (is a village and a community of the Oraiokastro municipality. Before the 2011 local government reform it was part of the municipality of Kallithea, of which it was a municipal district. The 2011 census recorded 2,022 inhabitants in the village. The community of Pentalofos covers an area of 29.874 km2.

History

In 1845 the Russian slavist Victor Grigorovich recorded Gradobor as mainly Bulgarian village.

See also
 List of settlements in the Thessaloniki regional unit

References

Populated places in Thessaloniki (regional unit)